Carmen Chaplin is a British/Irish actress and film director.  Carmen is the daughter of Michael Chaplin, granddaughter of Charlie Chaplin, and great-granddaughter of American playwright Eugene O'Neill. Her mother is the British-Irish painter Patricia Betaudier, daughter of Trinidadian artist Patrick Betaudier.

Background
Chaplin was born on 27 July 1972 in London, United Kingdom to a well-known actor Michael Chaplin, who is of English and Irish heritage and his second wife Patricia Betaudier, daughter of the interracial Irish and Trinidadian couple, and was raised in France and Spain.<ref>Frank Heer: [http://www.annabelle.ch/leben/kultur/carmen-chaplin-wie-lebt-es-sich-als-enkelin-einer-ikone-43213 Carmen Chaplin, wie lebt es sich als Enkelin einer Ikone?]. Annabelle, 2016-6-28 (interview, German)</ref> She made her film debut in Wim Wenders' Until the End of the World (1991), and has since appeared in several films, such as My Favourite Season (1993), The Serpent's Kiss (1997), and the US action comedy All About the Benjamins (2002). She has directed one short film, Tryst in Paname'', starring her real-life sister Dolores Chaplin and Bambou Gainsbourg.

Filmography

Ancestry

References

External links

Living people
Actresses from London
English film actresses
Carmen
English film directors
British people of American descent
British people of Trinidad and Tobago descent
British people of English descent
British people of Irish descent
British expatriates in Spain
British expatriates in France
20th-century English actresses
21st-century English actresses
1972 births